The Fifth Hughes ministry (Nationalist) was the 15th ministry of the Government of Australia. It was led by the country's 7th Prime Minister, Billy Hughes. The Fourth Hughes ministry succeeded the Fourth Hughes ministry, which dissolved on 3 February 1920 following the federal election that took place in December. The ministry was replaced by the First Bruce ministry on 9 February 1923 following the 1922 federal election and the subsequent resignation of Hughes as Prime Minister.

Stanley Bruce, who died in 1967, was the last surviving member of the Fifth Hughes ministry; Bruce was also the last surviving member of the First Bruce ministry and the Second Bruce ministry.

Ministry

References

Ministries of George V
Hughes, 5
1920 establishments in Australia
1923 disestablishments in Australia
Australian Labor Party ministries
Cabinets established in 1920
Cabinets disestablished in 1923